Raili is a Finnish feminine given name that may refer to
Raili Halttu (1909–2006), Finnish sprint runner
Raili Hoviniemi (born 1936), Finnish Olympic gymnast
Raili Kauppi (1920–1995), Finnish philosopher
Raili Pietilä (1926–2021), Finnish architect
Raili Riuttala (born 1933), Finnish swimmer 
Raili Sallinen, Finnish ski orienteering competitor

Finnish feminine given names